D. Joaquim Gonçalves (17 May 1936 – 31 December 2013) was a Portuguese Roman Catholic bishop.

Ordained to the priesthood on 10 July 1960, Gonçalves was named bishop of the Roman Catholic Diocese of Vila Real, Portugal on 19 January 1991 and retired on 17 May 2011.

References

1936 births
2013 deaths
People from Fafe
20th-century Roman Catholic bishops in Portugal
21st-century Roman Catholic bishops in Portugal